Henriette Løvar (born 22 August 1979 as Henriette Wang) is a Norwegian curler.

She was third for the Norwegian team at the 2010 Ford World Women's Curling Championship in Swift Current, Canada.

External links

References

Norwegian female curlers
Living people
1979 births
Universiade medalists in curling
Universiade bronze medalists for Norway
Medalists at the 2003 Winter Universiade